Převýšov is a municipality and village in Hradec Králové District in the Hradec Králové Region of the Czech Republic. It has about 300 inhabitants.

Geography
It lies on the border between the East Elbe Table and Central Elbe Table.

History
The first written mention of Převýšov is from 1386, when there was a stronghold. The village was part of the Chlumec estate. The most notable owners were the Kinsky family and the Pernštejn family. Vojtěch I of Pernštejn had founded vineyards here, but winegroving ended during the Thirty Years' War. In the 1870s, a railway was constructed, which contributed to the development of the area.

Transport
Převýšov is located on the railway line from Chlumec nad Cidlinou to Trutnov.

Sport
The municipality is home to SK Převýšov, which plays in lower amateur tiers.

Sights
There is a wooden belfry in the village.

References

External links

Villages in Hradec Králové District